This is a list of reptiles which are found in the U.S. state of Florida. This list includes both native and introduced species. Introduced species are put on this list only if they have an established population (large breeding population, numerous specimens caught, invasive, etc.). Three out of the four orders of reptiles can be found in Florida, with the order Tuatara being absent. Though many sources have different amounts (due to introduced species), this lists 118 species, which is about right.

Testudines
This order includes all the freshwater and sea turtles, as well as the land tortoises. Overall, 26 species can be found. Florida has many turtles, but only one species of tortoise.

Emydids
Pond slider
Spotted turtle
Painted turtle
Chicken turtle
Coastal plain cooter
Common box turtle
false map turtle
Escambia map turtle
Barbour's map turtle
Florida red-bellied cooter
Peninsula cooter
Suwannee cooter
Red-eared slider
Yellow-bellied slider
Eastern river cooter
Diamondback terrapin

Snapping turtles
Alligator snapping turtle
Common snapping turtle

Mud turtles
Eastern mud turtle
Striped mud turtle
Common musk turtle
Loggerhead musk turtle

Softshells
Spiny softshell turtle
Smooth softshell turtle
Florida softshell turtle

Leatherback
Leatherback sea turtle

Sea turtles
Green sea turtle
Hawksbill sea turtle
Loggerhead sea turtle
Kemp's ridley sea turtle - rare vagrant
Olive ridley sea turtle - extremely rare vagrant

Tortoises
Gopher tortoise

Crocodilians
There are three species of Crocodilians found in Florida. They are the largest reptiles and the largest predators of the state.

Alligators
American alligator
Spectacled caiman - introduced

Crocodiles
American crocodile

Squamates (suborder Lacertilia)
The squamates are by far the largest reptile order. It is therefore divided into suborders. Lizards may be the most numerous reptiles in the state, though many species were introduced.

Phrynosomatidae
 Texas horned lizard - introduced
Florida scrub lizard
Eastern fence lizard

Leiocephalidae
 northern curly-tailed lizard - introduced
 Hispaniolan curlytail lizard - introduced

Agamidae
Calotes mystaceus - introduced
Common agama- introduced
Butterfly lizard- introduced
Oriental garden lizard - introduced

Dactyloidae
Green anole							
Brown anole - introduced					
Bark anole	- introduced
Knight anole - introduced
Puerto Rican crested anole syn. common Puerto Rican anole - introduced
Large-headed anole	- introduced
Cuban green anole - introduced
Hispaniolan green anole - introduced
Jamaican giant anole - introduced

Iguanidae
Green iguana - introduced
Black spiny-tailed iguana- introduced
Ctenosaura pectinata - introduced

Corytophanidae
Brown basilisk- introduced

Chamaeleonidae
Veiled chameleon - introduced 
Oustalet's chameleon - introduced
Jackson's chameleon- introduced

Varanidae
Nile monitor - introduced

Teiidae
Six-lined racerunner
Giant ameiva (Ameiva ameiva) - introduced
Rainbow whiptail - introduced
Argentine black and white tegu - introduced

Gekkota
Reef gecko
Ocellated gecko - introduced
Tarentola annularis - introduced
Flat-tailed house gecko - introduced
Ashy gecko - introduced
Tokay gecko - introduced
Mediterranean house gecko - introduced
Tropical house gecko - introduced
Bibron's thick-toed gecko - introduced
Indo-Pacific gecko - introduced
Yellow-headed gecko - introduced
Madagascan giant day gecko - introduced

Scincidae
Mole skink
Coal skink
Sand skink
Broadhead skink
Chalcides ocellatus - introduced
Eutropis rudis - introduced
Trachylepis quinquetaeniata - introduced
Five-lined skink
Southeastern five-lined skink

Anguidae
Eastern glass lizard
Slender glass lizard
Mimic glass lizard
Island glass lizard

Squamates (suborder Serpentes)
This suborder includes all kinds of snakes. There are many snakes in Florida, some venomous and others non-venomous, and unlike lizards, nearly all are native. Two species are introduced, including the Burmese python, which was introduced when Hurricane Andrew destroyed a holding facility full of imported snakes, and which created a huge media storm and fears it would become widely invasive, but this species has proven unable to withstand colder weather outside of extreme South Florida.

Blind snakes
Brahminy blind snake - introduced

Boidae
Common boa - introduced
Yellow anaconda - introduced
Green anaconda - introduced

Colubrids
Corn snake
Mud snake
Ribbon snake
Rainbow snake
Black rat snake
Common garter snake
Rough green snake
Pine snake
Redbelly snake
Eastern racer
Southern black racer
Scarlet snake
American brown snake
Rough earth snake
Smooth earth snake
Florida crown snake
Southeastern crown snake
Rim rock crown snake
Swamp snake
Short-tailed snake
Queen snake
Striped crayfish snake
Glossy crayfish snake
Pine woods snake
Common kingsnake
Mole kingsnake
Scarlet kingsnake
Salt marsh snake
Gulf salt marsh snake
Green water snake
Brown water snake
Banded water snake
Midland water snake
Plainbelly water snake
Coachwhip
Ringneck snake
Eastern indigo snake
Eastern hognose snake
Southern hognose snake

Elapids
Eastern coral snake

Pythons
Burmese python - introduced
Indian rock python - introduced
African rock python - introduced

Vipers
Cottonmouth
Southern copperhead
Pygmy rattlesnake
Timber rattlesnake
Eastern diamondback rattlesnake

Squamates (suborder Amphisbaenidae)
This is the smallest and least known squamate suborder. It contains the wormlike amphisbaenids. Florida has one species.

Amphisbaenids
Florida worm lizard

References

Sources
Reptile Database
Florida Herpetology Center
Invasive reptiles
Invasive

Reptiles
Florida